Marina Ruggieri from the University of Rome Tor Vergata, Rome, Italy was named Fellow of the Institute of Electrical and Electronics Engineers (IEEE) in 2014 for contributions to millimeter-wave satellite communications.

References

Fellow Members of the IEEE
Living people
Year of birth missing (living people)
Place of birth missing (living people)
Academic staff of the University of Rome Tor Vergata